The Liberty County School District, or the Liberty County School System (LCSS), is a public school district in Liberty County, Georgia, United States, based in Hinesville. It serves the communities of Allenhurst, Flemington, Gumbranch, Hinesville, Midway, Riceboro, and Walthourville.

It is the designated school district for grades K-12 for the county, except parts in Fort Stewart. Fort Stewart has the Department of Defense Education Activity (DoDEA) as its local school district, for the elementary level. Students at the secondary level on Fort Stewart attend public schools operated by county school districts.

Schools
The Liberty County School District has seven elementary schools, three middle schools, and two high schools.

Elementary schools
 Button Gwinnett Elementary School
 Liberty Elementary School
 Frank Long Elementary School
 Lyman Hall Elementary School
 Joseph Martin Elementary School
 Waldo Pafford Elementary School
 Taylors Creek Elementary School

Middle schools
 Lewis Frasier Middle School
 Midway Middle School
 Snelson-Golden Middle School

High schools
 Bradwell Institute
 Liberty County High School

Gallery

References

External links

 

School districts in Georgia (U.S. state)
Education in Liberty County, Georgia